Mohamed Abdel-Latif "Mimi" El-Sherbini (born 26 July 1937) is an Egyptian former footballer who played as a defender for Al-Ahly and the Egyptian national team. He took part in the 1959 Africa Cup of Nations, scoring in Egypt's 4–0 victory against Ethiopia, and went on to win the tournament with the team. He also represented his country in the 1960 and 1964 Summer Olympics.

After retiring, El-Sherbini moved into management, and was briefly in charge of the United Arab Emirates national team in 1975.

Honours
 Africa Cup of Nations: 1959

References

External links
 

1938 births
Living people
People from Mansoura, Egypt
Egyptian footballers
Association football defenders
Egypt international footballers
Al Ahly SC players
Olympic footballers of Egypt
Footballers at the 1960 Summer Olympics
Footballers at the 1964 Summer Olympics
1959 African Cup of Nations players
1962 African Cup of Nations players
1963 African Cup of Nations players
United Arab Emirates national football team managers
Africa Cup of Nations-winning players
Egyptian Premier League players
Egyptian football managers
Egyptian expatriate football managers
Egyptian expatriate sportspeople in the United Arab Emirates
Expatriate football managers in the United Arab Emirates